is a Japanese football player currently playing for BG Pathum United, on loan from Cerezo Osaka.

Career statistics

Club
Updated 18 July 2022.

1Includes Emperor's Cup, Thai FA Cup.

2Includes J. League Cup, Thai League Cup.

3Includes AFC Champions League.

4Includes J2 Play-offs and Japanese Super Cup.

References

External links

Yusuke Maruhashi at Cerezo Osaka official site 
Yusuke Maruhashi – Yahoo! Japan competition record 

1990 births
Living people
Association football people from Osaka Prefecture
Japanese footballers
J1 League players
J2 League players
Yusuke Maruhashi
Cerezo Osaka players
Yusuke Maruhashi
Association football defenders